Robert Ben Garant (born September 14, 1970), credited earlier in his career as Ben Garant, is an American actor, comedian, screenwriter, producer and director.  He has a long professional relationship with Thomas Lennon and Kerri Kenney-Silver from their time on the sketch-comedy show The State, the cop show spoof Reno 911!, and numerous screenwriting collaborations.

Early life
Garant was born in Cookeville, Tennessee, and grew up in Farragut, Tennessee.  He lived in New York City for several years and attended the Tisch School of the Arts at New York University. While at NYU he was a member of sketch comedy troupe The State.

Career
Garant was a cast member on the 1993-1995 MTV sketch comedy series The State. In 2003, Garant, Thomas Lennon and Kerri Kenney-Silver, all members of The State, created the mockumentary show Reno 911!, which aired on Comedy Central; Garant appeared on the show as Deputy Travis Junior.

Garant and Lennon are frequent writing partners, and have written several successful screenplays together, including the Night at the Museum films. Their films have earned over $1.4 billion in box office revenue alone.

Garant and Lennon created and starred in a 2010 sitcom pilot for NBC called The Strip. However, it was not ordered as a series. Later in 2010, Garant and Lennon created a pilot for FX called USS Alabama, a sci-fi/comedy set a thousand years in the future, aboard a United Nations peacekeeping spaceship, the U.S.S. Alabama. This pilot was not picked up either.

In 2011, Garant and Lennon released a book about their careers called Writing Movies for Fun and Profit: How We Made a Billion Dollars at The Box Office and You Can Too!

In 2020, Garant reprised his role as Deputy Travis Junior in the seventh season of Reno 911! which aired on Quibi. He also appeared in the 2021 Paramount+ movie, Reno 911! The Hunt for QAnon. The eighth season of the series, now titled Reno 911! Defunded, premiered on The Roku Channel in February 2022.

Personal life
Garant currently resides in Los Angeles, California. He is married to actress Cathy Shim, and they have two children.

Filmography
 The State (TV) (1993–1995) – co-creator, actor
 Viva Variety (TV) (1997–1999) – co-creator, actor
 Reno 911! (TV) (2003–2009, 2020-present) – co-creator, actor, director
 Taxi (2004) – writer
 The Pacifier (2005) – writer
 Herbie: Fully Loaded (2005) – writer
 Let's Go to Prison (2006) – writer
 Night at the Museum (2006) – writer
 Balls of Fury (2007) – director, writer
 Reno 911!: Miami (2007) – director, writer, actor
 Night at the Museum: Battle of the Smithsonian (2009) – writer, actor
 Archer (TV) (2010) – guest voice actor
 Bob's Burgers (TV) (2011) – guest voice actor
 Hell Baby (2013) – director, writer, actor
 The Aquabats! Super Show! (2014) - guest voice actor
 Jessabelle (2014) – writer
 Rocky and Bullwinkle -  narrator (also writer)
 Night at the Museum: Secret of the Tomb (2014) – writer
 Bajillion Dollar Propertie$ (2016) – director, actor
 The Veil (2016) – writer
 Baywatch (2017) – story writer
 Raising Buchanan (2019) – actor
 Paws of Fury: The Legend of Hank (2022) – special thanks
 Reno 911! The Hunt for QAnon – actor, director, writer

References

External links
 

1970 births
Living people
People from Cookeville, Tennessee
Male actors from Tennessee
American sketch comedians
American male comedians
21st-century American comedians
American male film actors
American male screenwriters
American male television actors
American television writers
American television directors
Tisch School of the Arts alumni
Film directors from Tennessee
Showrunners
American male television writers
People from Farragut, Tennessee
Comedy film directors
Farragut High School alumni
Television producers from Tennessee